Eleanor Joanne Daley  (born April 21, 1955) is a Canadian composer of choral and church music, a church choir director, choral clinician and accompanist. She lives and works in Toronto, Ontario. Among her best-known works are The Rose Trilogy and Requiem.

Early life and education
Daley was born in Parry Sound, Ontario. She earned a bachelor's degree in organ performance from Queen's University in Kingston, Ontario, and attained diplomas in piano and organ, having studied in both Canada and England.

Career

As a composer, Daley has been commissioned by choral groups and arts organizations throughout North America and Europe. In Canada, she composed for the Elmer Iseler Singers, the Amadeus Choir, the Bach Children's Chorus, the Maryland State Boychoir, the Amabile Youth Singers, Toronto Children's Chorus, the Cantabile Singers of Kingston, the Savridi Singers, the Vancouver Men's Chorus and the Victoria Scholars.

Daley worked under commission to a number of groups in the United States, including the Master Chorale of Tampa Bay, Texas Woman's University, the Texas Choral Directors Association, and received the 2008 Brock Commission from the American Choral Directors Association. Commissions from Europe include festivals in Norway and Germany, and England's Oxford University Press.  Daley's music has been published by Canadian, US, and UK-based printing houses.

Daley's a capella work "I Sing a Maiden" was performed in New York in 2014 by a 400-voice choir as part of an International Women's Day celebration.

Daley continues to work as a composer. Her work "My Master from a Garden Rose" has been recorded by the Genesis Ensemble. 2018 she serves as the music and choir director at Fairlawn Avenue United Church and as accompanist for the Bach Children's Chorus.

She was appointed to the Order of Canada in 2022, "for her contributions to Canadian music and choral culture as a renowned composer and accompanist."

See also 
 Music of Canada
 List of Canadian composers

References

External links
Eleanor Daley at Alliance Music Publications. Retrieved 18 January 2013.

1955 births
Living people
Canadian classical composers
Canadian classical organists
Queen's University at Kingston alumni
People from Parry Sound, Ontario
Classical composers of church music
20th-century classical composers
21st-century classical composers
Women classical composers
Canadian choral conductors
20th-century Canadian composers
Women organists
20th-century conductors (music)
21st-century Canadian conductors (music)
21st-century organists
20th-century women composers
21st-century women composers
Canadian women composers
Officers of the Order of Canada
Musicians from Toronto